The L-myc internal ribosome entry site (IRES) is an RNA element present in the 5' UTR of the mRNA of L-myc that allows cap-independent translation. L-myc undergoes translation via the internal ribosome entry site and bypasses the typical eukaryotic cap-dependent translation pathway [1].  The myc family of genes when expressed are known to be involved in the control of cell growth, differentiation and apoptosis.

References

Further reading

External links 
 

Cis-regulatory RNA elements